Ousmane Camara (born 12 May 1989) is a French professional basketball player who last played for Élan Chalon of the French LNB Pro A.

Professional career
In the 2014–15 season, Camara played his first season for Limoges CSP. With the team he won the LNB Pro A championship, after Limoges beat Strasbourg IG 3–1 in the Finals. Camara was named the Finals MVP, after averaging 7.25 points per game in the series.

Statistics

References

1989 births
Living people
BCM Gravelines players
Centers (basketball)
Élan Chalon players
French men's basketball players
Limoges CSP players
People from Mont-Saint-Aignan
Sportspeople from Seine-Maritime
STB Le Havre players